Birkenhead Town Hall is a civic building and former town hall in Birkenhead on the Wirral Peninsula in Merseyside, England. The building was the former administrative headquarters of the County Borough of Birkenhead, and more recently, council offices for the Metropolitan Borough of Wirral. Birkenhead Town Hall remains the location of the town's register office. However, since the closure of the Wirral Museum in 2010, there is uncertainty over the future purpose of the Grade II* listed building.

History
When Hamilton Square was designed in the early 19th century, a plot of land was made available for the siting of a town hall between Hamilton Street and Chester Street. Designed by local architect Christopher Ellison, the building was constructed using Scottish granite and sandstone from the now filled-in local quarry at Storeton. It was officially opened in 1887.

The building consisted of a council chamber, offices, with a concert hall and function rooms known as the Assembly Rooms. Birkenhead's magistrates' court chambers are located in a separate building of the same design to the rear. The clock tower is 200 feet in height and consists of four faces. After a fire in 1901, the upper part of the clock tower was rebuilt to a design by Henry Hartley. The rebuilding included a stained glass window by Gilbert P. Gamon representing Edward I's visit to Birkenhead Priory in 1277.

Despite the abolition of the County Borough of Birkenhead on 1 April 1974, the building continued to be used as council offices until the early 1990s, when work was undertaken to restore the external stonework and many interior decorations and features, including the former council chamber.

The Wirral Archives Service was based in the building until 2008, when it transferred to the council's Cheshire Lines Building nearby. The service collects and stores all types of historical documents relating to the Wirral area, its people, businesses and institutions. Amongst the records in the collection are documents and photographs from Birkenhead's Cammell Laird shipyard, when the original company closed in 1993.

Between 2001 and 2010, the Wirral Museum occupied a significant portion of the building. It featured both themed and permanent exhibits such as the history and development of Wirral, the Cammell Laird collection, the Wirral Silver and Mayoral collections, Della Robbia Pottery and a detailed scale model of the historic Woodside area in 1934.

Current uses
Birkenhead Town Hall still retains some civic service, such as the municipal registration centre for births, marriages and deaths and as a venue for local and national elections. It is also utilised for the celebration of notable occasions and as the town's focal point for annual Remembrance Sunday ceremonies. Some of the grand civic rooms are also used for social events including weddings.

Future
In 2009 owners Wirral Borough Council advertised the building for sale or lease, as part of its Strategic Asset Review. The council has invited "expressions of interest from individuals and organisations who can demonstrate that they can secure a sustainable use for this important building."

See also
Listed buildings in Birkenhead

References

External links
 Birkenhead Town Hall bells
 Wirral Archives Service

Buildings and structures in Birkenhead
Grade II* listed buildings in Merseyside
Tourist attractions in Merseyside
City and town halls in Merseyside
Government buildings completed in 1887
Classical architecture
Government buildings with domes